Live in Concert is a live album by the James Gang, released in September 1971. It contains highlights of a May 15, 1971 performance at Carnegie Hall, New York City. This album is the last James Gang release to feature Joe Walsh as guitarist and vocalist and Bill Szymczyk as producer and engineer. The album reached Gold status in June 1972.

Critical reception

Writing for AllMusic, critic Stephen Thomas Erlewine wrote the album "Live in Concert captures much of the energy of their live performances, with Joe Walsh's guitar solos catching fire on nearly every song. However, the record also makes it clear that he was beginning to outgrow the confines of the James Gang..."

Track listing
All songs by Joe Walsh, except where noted.

NOTE:

An audience recording of the complete concert has circulated throughout the internet as a download and has several additional tracks:

 "Midnight Man"
 "Asshtonpark"
 "The Bomber"
 "Garden Gate"
 "Funk 49"
 "Woman"
 "White Man, Black Man"
 "Thanks"
 "Again"
 "Johnny B. Goode"

Personnel 
James Gang
Joe Walsh – electric 6- (1, 2, 6, 7) and 12-string (5) guitars, vocals, Hammond B3 organ (3, 4)
Dale Peters – bass guitar, vocals, percussion
Jim Fox – drums, vocals, percussion, acoustic guitar

Production 
James Gang: Producers
Bill Szymczyk: Engineer

Sales chart performance

References

James Gang albums
1971 live albums
ABC Records live albums
Albums produced by Jim Fox (drummer)
Albums produced by Joe Walsh
Albums recorded at Carnegie Hall